Lovers' Legends: The Greek Myths is a 2002 book by Andrew Calimach about homosexuality and paederasty in Greek myth.

Lovers' Legends Unbound
Lovers' Legends Unbound is a theatrical production directed by Agnes Lev, performed by Timothy Carter, with incidental music composed and performed by Steve Gorn. The work was released by Haiduk Press in 2004 as an audio-CD together with an illustrated libretto.

Taken from a review of the piece by Keith Matthews, "The study of male homosexuality in Ancient Greece only began in the 1970s, particularly following the publication of Kenneth Dover's Greek Homosexuality in 1978. This book helped to strip away many of the misconceptions about same-sex love in the Classical world that had grown up during the nineteenth century and that were becoming commonplace with the growth of the Gay Liberation movement from the late 1960s. What Dover sought to demonstrate was that in Classical Athens, there was an institutionalized form of same-sex behavior, whereby an older man (the ’εραστης, ‘desirer’) is inflamed with passion for a youth (the ’ερομενος, ‘the desired’) and eases his path into full adult life. He suggested that this almost ritualized ‘education’ of the youth might have deeper roots in a Primitive Indo-European initiation rite that has left traces in other cultures."

Table of Contents

Tantalus and the Olympians
Pelops in Pisa 
Laius and Chrysippus 
Zeus and Ganymede 
Hercules and Hylas 
Orpheus 
Apollo and Hyacinthus 
Narcissus
Achilles and Patroclus 
Hippodamia

Framing the tales is Pseudo-Lucian's "Different Loves".

References

External links
Haiduk Press—Lovers' Legends
Haiduk Press
Lovers' Legends: The Gay Greek Myths at the Magnus Hirschfeld Archive for Sexology

Greek mythology
Pederasty in ancient Greece
LGBT literature in the United States
Pederastic literature
2002 books
2000s LGBT literature